Lokomotiv Metalex Bild is a Bulgarian handball team based in Varna.

History
Handball club Lokomotiv – Varna was established in 1963 with Mr. Georgi Velikov as a president of the club and its first coach the honoured master of sports Dimitar Nushev. Mr. Alexander Evtimov was elected as a president of Handball club "Lokomotiv Nadin" in 2003. Mrs. Rumyana Radusheva has been a president of Handball club "Lokomotiv Metalex Build" since 2004.

Trophies
Lokomotiv Metalex Bild has been a Champion of Bulgaria 11 times since the year 2000 (in 2000, 2001, 2002, 2003, 2005, 2007, 2017, 2018, and 2019) and 9 times a winner of Bulgarian Cup (1998, 2000, 2005, 2006, 2007, 2016, 2017, 2018, and 2019) and the First champion of Beach handball in 1997. From 1998 until 2007 was 5 times Champion of Bulgaria of Beach handball.

Lokomotiv Varna currently holds the record for the longest unbeaten streak in the history of handball with 73 consecutive wins during period from June 4, 2016 till nowadays.

European record

Current squad 2008/2009
''The numbers are established according to the official website: www.lokomotiv-mb.com 
Men's

Coach: Hristo Yordanov

Women's

Coach: Zdravko Petrov

Stadium information
Name: - Kongresna 
City: - Varna
Capacity: - 6,000

External links
 Lokomotiv Metalex Bild Official Website

Lokomotiv Metalex Bild